Staverton as a place name may refer to:

Staverton, Devon, England
Staverton, Gloucestershire, England
 can refer to the nearby Gloucestershire Airport
Staverton, Northamptonshire, England
Staverton, Tasmania, Australia
Staverton, Wiltshire, England
Staverton Road, North Oxford, England